Broken Pledge is an Alove for Enemies EP released in 2003 on Strikefist Records.

Track listing
Broken Pledge
Center of Attention
Bloodflower
Lost at Sea
Give to Caesar
The Silent Rival

2003 EPs
Alove for Enemies albums